Giovanni Antonio Amadeo (c. 1447 – 27 or 28 August 1522) was an Italian Renaissance sculptor of the Early Renaissance, architect, and engineer.

Biography
Amadeo was born in Pavia. In 1470 he was commissioned by Bartolomeo Colleoni to complete his funerary chapel, the Cappella Colleoni in Bergamo, which had been begun by Guiniforte and Francesco Solari. Amadeo added polychrome decoration and many sculptures in the ancient style including medallions, small columns, busts, reliefs of "Histories from the Old Testament" and "Histories of Hercules". Amadeo also designed the funerary monument to Medea Colleoni, which was intended for the church of Santa Maria della Basella in Urgnano. The condottiero's tomb was realized in collaboration with other artists, with Amadeo providing the reliefs of the lower sarcophagus and of the smaller upper sarcophagus, as well seven statues of the Virtues.

Amadeo was also commissioned by Duke Galeazzo Maria Sforza to work for some years in the Certosa di Pavia.  During 1473–1476, Amadeo realized half of the bas-reliefs in the right side of the façade. In 1480 he finished the arch of the Persian Martyrs in the Olivetani Monastery of Cremona (four marble reliefs remain today, dated 1484). Also attributed to him are two statues of Justice and Temperance in Cremona, and reliefs in the National Antiquity Museum of Parma. In 1485 he collaborated with his brother-in-law Pietro Antonio Solari in the Ospedale Maggiore of Milan, a project of which he was made director ten years later.

Amadeo was then active in the decoration of the Milan Cathedral. He collaborated with Donato Bramante on the facade of Santa Maria presso San Satiro in Milan. In 1488 Amadeo was commissioned by Cardinal Ascanio Sforza, to become director of works of the new Pavia Cathedral, again with Bramante having a minor role. In 1489, he helped design and build the Arca di San Lanfranco for the church of that name in Pavia. In this period he worked also as Ducal engineer for Ludovico il Moro, designing fortifications at Chiavenna and Piattamale, as well as repairing of roads and bridges in Valtellina and (in the 16th century) hydraulic works; for Ludovico, he also realized a Loggia in the Ducal Palace of Vigevano, as well as some statues for the Milanese Cathedral. From 1495 Amadeo directed the works of the church of Santa Maria presso San Celso at Milan. From 1497 he directed works at the Milan Cathedral, finishing the tambour in 1500.

In the 16th century, Amadeo designed the church of Santa Maria di Canepanova, also in Pavia. In 1501 he sculpted reliefs with "Stories of the Carthusians" and "life of St. Bruno" for the Certosa of Pavia. In 1982 it has been proven that the Sanctuary of Santa Maria alla Fontana in Milan, attributed for many years to Leonardo da Vinci was in fact designed by Amadeo. In 1508 he also presented a model for the spire of the Milan Cathedral, which was not executed.

The notable façade of the Cathedral of Lugano, considered a masterpiece of Renaissance architecture, has also been attributed to Amadeo

He died in Milan in 1522.

References

http://www.visual-arts-cork.com/history-of-art/early-renaissance-artists.htm
https://archive.org/stream/bollettinodellep1905bibl/bollettinodellep1905bibl_djvu.txt

External links
Metropolitan Museum of Art.org: Leonardo da Vinci: anatomical drawings from the Royal Library, Windsor Castle (online PDF) — exhibition catalog with material on Giovanni Antonio Amadeo (see index).
Cork.com: Renaissance sculptors

Italian Renaissance architects
Italian Renaissance sculptors
1440s births
1522 deaths
Architects from Pavia
Italian engineers
15th-century Italian architects
15th-century Italian sculptors
Italian male sculptors
16th-century Italian sculptors
16th-century Italian architects